Damien Quinn (born 24 August 1981) is an Australian professional rugby league footballer.

In 2001, Quinn played on the wing for the Toowoomba Clydesdales in the Queensland Cup Grand Final against the Redcliffe Dolphins, regarded as the most exciting Grand Final in Queenaland Cup History. He was a key player for the Crusaders since joining in 2006, and he won National League One's Player of the Year award in 2008

In August 2009, Quinn, along with five team mates, was ordered to leave the United Kingdom after the UK Border Agency identified breaches to their visa conditions. The Celtic Crusaders cancelled Quinn's contract with immediate effect.

References

1981 births
Living people
Australian rugby league players
Crusaders Rugby League players
Lézignan Sangliers players
Place of birth missing (living people)
Rugby league five-eighths
Toowoomba Clydesdales players